Jalen Terrell Woods (born June 10, 2000) is an American football safety for the Los Angeles Chargers of the National Football League (NFL). He played college football at Baylor and was drafted in the third round with the 79th overall pick of the 2022 NFL Draft.

Professional career

Woods was drafted by the Los Angeles Chargers in the third round, 79th overall, of the 2022 NFL Draft.

References

External links
 Los Angeles Chargers bio
 Baylor Bears bio

Living people
2000 births
Players of American football from San Antonio
American football safeties
Baylor Bears football players
Los Angeles Chargers players